Tunç Başaran (October 1, 1938 – December 18, 2019) was a Turkish screenwriter, film director, film producer and actor.

Biography 

After attending the Faculty of Literature for a while he left school and started working as a script writer for the director Memduh Ün. He then continued to be the assistant of Memduh Ün for a long time. Meanwhile, he also worked as assistant for such directors as Ömer Lütfi Akad, Halit Refiğ, Atıf Yılmaz, Ertem Göreç. In 1964 he directed his first feature Survival. By 1962, he had directed about 40 films. After 1972, he switched to commercials. He directed Don't Let Them Shoot The Kite in 1989.
He served on the advisory board of the Istanbul International Film Festival.

Filmography

Director
 On Korkusuz Adam (1964) ... a.k.a. Ten Fearless Men (International: English title)
 Kara Memed (1964)
 Hayat Kavgası (1964) ... a.k.a. The Struggle to Live
 On Korkusuz Kadın (1965) ... a.k.a. Ten Fearless Women (International: English title)
 Murtaza (1965)
 Konyakçı (1965)
 Horasan'ın Üç Atlısı (1965)
 Vatan Kurtaran Aslan (1966)
 Kanunsuz Yol (1966)
 Fatih'in Fedaisi (1966)
 Kara Davut (1967)
 Elveda (1967)
 Büyük Kin (1967)
 Gönüllü Kahramanlar (1968)
 Tarkan (1969)
 Hazreti Ali (1969)
 Allah'in Aslanı Ali (1969)
 Acı İle Karışık (1969)
 Üç Kral Serseri (1970)
 Küçük Hanımın Şoförü (1970)
 Gönül Meyhanesi (1970)
 Gölgedeki Adam (1970)
 Cafer Bey (1970)
 On Küçük Şeytan (1971)
 Korkusuz Kaptan Swing (1971) ... a.k.a. Courageous Captain Swing (USA: literal English title)
 Ayşecik ve Sihirli Cüceler Rüyalar Ülkesinde (1971) ... a.k.a. Ayşecik and the Bewitched Dwarfs in Dreamland ... a.k.a. Ayşecik in the Land of the Magic Dwarfs (USA: literal English title) ... a.k.a. The Turkish Wizard of Oz (USA: video box title)

... a.k.a. Turkish Wizard of Oz (USA: bootleg title)
 Gece List of Turkish films of 1972
 Şehvet (1972)
 Demir Yumruk: Devler Geliyor (1973) ... a.k.a. Iron Fist: The Giants Are Coming (USA: literal English title)
 Biri ve Diğerleri (1987) ... a.k.a. One and the Others
 Uçurtmayı Vurmasınlar (1989) ... a.k.a. Don't Let Them Shoot the Kite (International: English title: festival title)
 Piyano Piyano Bacaksız (1990) ... a.k.a. Piano Piano Kid (USA) ... a.k.a. Softly, Softly Little One
 Uzun İnce Bir Yol (1991) ... a.k.a. A Long Narrow Path
 Sen de Gitme (1995) ... a.k.a. Don't Leave Triandfilis

... a.k.a. Ne pars pas, Triandfilis (France) ... a.k.a. Please Don't Go

 Azmi (1995) (mini) TV Series
 Kaçıklık Diplomasi (1998)
 Abuzer Kadayıf (2000)
 Üç Kişilik Aşk (2004) (TV)
 Teberik Şanssız (2004)
 Büyülü Fener (2005)
 Sinema Bir Mucizedir (2005)

Screenwriter
 Kara Memed (1964)
 Kanunsuz Yol (1966)
 Büyük Kin (1967)
 Gönüllü Kahramanlar (1968)
 Acı İle Karışık (1969)
 Üç Kral Serseri (1970)
 Gönül Meyhanesi (1970)
 Cafer Bey (1970)
 Şehvet (1972)
 Demir Yumruk: Devler Geliyor (1973) ... a.k.a. Iron Fist: The Giants Are Coming (USA: literal English title)
 Uçurtmayı Vurmasınlar (1989) ... a.k.a. Don't Let Them Shoot the Kite (International: English title: festival title)
 Piyano Piyano Bacaksız (1990) ... a.k.a. Piano Piano Kid (USA) ... a.k.a. Softly, Softly Little One
 Uzun İnce Bir Yol (1991) ... a.k.a. A Long Narrow Path
 Kaçıklık Diplomasi (1998)

Actor
 Beş Kardeştiler (1962)
 Rıfat Diye Biri (1962) ... a.k.a. A Person Named Rıfat (International: English title)
 Bire On Vardı (1963)

Producer
 Uçurtmayı Vurmasınlar (1989) ... a.k.a. Don't Let Them Shoot the Kite (International: English title: festival title)

Notes

References 
 Turksinemasi.com - Biography of Tunç Başaran
 Sinematurk.com - Filmography of Tunç Başaran

External links 

1938 births
2019 deaths
Turkish film directors
Turkish male screenwriters
Turkish film producers
Turkish male film actors
Best Director Golden Boll Award winners
Best Director Golden Orange Award winners
Golden Orange Life Achievement Award winners
Deaths from cancer in Turkey
Deaths from soft-tissue sarcoma